"Under the Tree" is a single by The Water Babies released in the UK on 12 December 2005. It was written by Peter Lawlor, formerly of Stiltskin, for a Vodafone 3G advertisement, which appeared on television in the weeks preceding Christmas. The song was in the UK Singles Chart Top 75 for three weeks, entering at #30 on 24 December 2005, and peaked at position #27 the following week.

References

2005 singles
British Christmas songs
2005 songs